Louise Currey (née McPaul; born 24 January 1969 in Port Kembla, New South Wales) is a retired Australian track and field athlete. Originally a heptathlete, she later specialized in the javelin throw. She is married to fellow retired Australian javelin thrower Andrew Currey.

Currey won gold at the 1994 and 1998 Commonwealth Games, as well as a silver medal at the 1996 Olympics. Her personal best (new javelin) throw of 66.80 metres, achieved in 2000, was the Australian record until bested by Kim Mickle in 2014. Competing at her last competition, the 2000 Summer Olympics, she was knocked out in the qualifying round.

Achievements

References

 
 

1969 births
Living people
Australian heptathletes
Australian female javelin throwers
Athletes (track and field) at the 1994 Commonwealth Games
Athletes (track and field) at the 1998 Commonwealth Games
Athletes (track and field) at the 1992 Summer Olympics
Athletes (track and field) at the 1996 Summer Olympics
Athletes (track and field) at the 2000 Summer Olympics
Olympic athletes of Australia
Sportswomen from New South Wales
Commonwealth Games gold medallists for Australia
Olympic silver medalists in athletics (track and field)
Australian Institute of Sport track and field athletes
Olympic silver medalists for Australia
Commonwealth Games medallists in athletics
Medalists at the 1996 Summer Olympics
Competitors at the 1991 Summer Universiade
20th-century Australian women
Medallists at the 1994 Commonwealth Games
Medallists at the 1998 Commonwealth Games